The Royal and Pontifical University of Mexico (in ) was founded on 21 September 1551 by Royal Decree signed by Charles I of Spain, in Valladolid, Spain. It is generally considered the first university officially founded in North America and second in the Americas (preceded by the National University of San Marcos in Lima, Peru, chartered on May 12 of the same year).

After the Mexican War of Independence it was renamed University of Mexico. When Mexican liberals were in power at intervals in the nineteenth century, it was closed, since liberals sought to put education in the hands of the state rather than the Roman Catholic Church. Its first closure was in 1833, when Valentín Gómez Farías implemented liberal policies. When Antonio López de Santa Anna returned to power, the university was reopened. It was finally abolished in 1865 during the Second Mexican Empire by Maximilian I of Mexico. Scattered institutions, including secularized successors of its faculties of law and medicine, other secular colleges founded by liberals on the model of the French grandes ecoles, and religious establishments outside Mexico City, continued without interruption.

In 1910, during the regime of Porfirio Díaz, Justo Sierra merged and expanded Mexico City's decentralized colleges of higher education, founding the National Autonomous University of Mexico (UNAM). UNAM is a public university and considered the institutional heir of the earlier original University of Mexico, but under state rather than church control.

Organization

The university was organized by five faculties: Theology, Laws, Fees, Medicine, and Arts. The principal subjects or chairs (in Spanish, cátedras) were Prima and Vísperas, due to the initial class being in the morning and the second in the evening. The university granted different degrees such as bachiller, licenciado, maestro and doctor, which translate to bachelor, graduate, master and doctor respectively.

Notable alumni

Bartolomé de Alva, Roman Catholic secular clergyman and Nahuatl translator.
Joseph A. Lopez (1779–1841), priest and president of Georgetown University
Agustín Dávila Padilla (1562–1604), chronicler of the Dominican Order and its missions in America up to the end of the 16th century.

Notable faculty

Juan José Eguiara y Eguren (? - 1763), Roman Catholic bishop and scholar who served as its rector.
Francisco Cervantes de Salazar (1514? – 1575), a distinguished writer who served twice as rector during its early years.
Alonso Gutiérrez (1507–1584), Augustinian philosopher, historian, and intellectual figure.
Don Carlos de Sigüenza y Góngora (1645–1700), cartographer, historian and philosopher of the late 17th century.

See also 
 List of colonial universities in Latin America
 UNAM
 Pontifical University of Mexico

References

Educational institutions established in the 1550s
Catholic universities and colleges in Mexico
Universities in Mexico City
1551 establishments in the Spanish Empire
National Autonomous University of Mexico